Government Degree College Budgam (Urdu;) also known as Sheikh-ul-Alam Memorial Degree College Budgam (Urdu;), SAM College Budgam, is University of Kashmir affiliated autonomous co-educational degree college, located at district headquarter Budgam in the Indian union territory of Jammu and Kashmir.The college was founded in the year 2005 and is recognised by University Grants Commission of Indian under section 2(f) and (12b) of UGC Act, 1956.The College has started receiving grants from the UGC under various developmental schemes of academic and infrastructural nature.

Location 
The College is situated at Budgam, one of the oldest district headquarter in the Indian administered union territory of Jammu and Kashmir. It is located at a distance of about 16 km from the summer capital of Srinagar. The college is located on a hill under the lap of nature with a picturesque view overlooking the Budgam town. The college is the first institution of Higher Education in Budgam district.

Establishment 
Government of Jammu and Kashmir established the college during the Chief-Ministership of Mufti Mohammad Sayeed in the year 2005 under Prime Minister of India's Reconstruction plan. The college started its first academic session in the same year with just 33 students. It started its academic operations from Govt. Higher Secondary School Budgam. The present campus of college is functioning since July 2009. It is also called Sheikh-ul-Alam Memorial College named after the famous Reshi saint of Kashmir, it has majority of sunni students but still shia rule there because they are locals Sheikh Noor Din Wali.

Courses offered 
The college offers bachelor courses in Arts and Science streams.

Bachelor courses 

 Bachelors in Arts
 Bachelors in Compound Arts
 Bachelors in Science (Medical)
 Bachelors in Science (Non-Medical)

References 

Degree colleges in Kashmir Division
Universities and colleges in Jammu and Kashmir
University of Kashmir
2005 establishments in Jammu and Kashmir
Educational institutions established in 2005
Colleges affiliated to University of Kashmir